Austrostipa puberula is a plant species from the genus Austrostipa. This species was originally described by Surrey Wilfrid Laurance Jacobs and Joy Everett.

References

Sources

 
 

puberula
Taxa named by Joy Everett
Taxa named by Surrey Wilfrid Laurance Jacobs